The Jotunheimen shoe is a leather shoe discovered in the Jotunheimen Mountains in eastern Norway. The shoe, discovered in August 2006, was originally dated to around 1000 CE, but subsequent testing revealed it to be at least three thousand years old. Archaeologists now estimate that the shoe was made between 1800 and 1100 BCE, making it the oldest article of clothing discovered in Scandinavia. It was discovered along with several arrows and a wooden spade, leading archaeologists to conclude that they had unearthed an important hunting ground.

External links
 "Old Shoe- Even Older." The Norway Post, 2 May 2007.

Archaeology of Norway
Germanic archaeological artifacts